Mostert's Mill (Afrikaans: Mostert se Meul) is a historic windmill in Mowbray, Cape Town, South Africa. It was built in 1796 and was the oldest surviving complete windmill in South Africa. It was gutted in a wildfire on 18 April 2021. The fire had started on Table Mountain and spread, severely damaging a number of buildings.

History
The mill was built around 1796 as a private mill on the farm 'Welgelegen', owned by Gysbert van Renen and was named after his son-in-law, Sybrand Mostert, after Van Renen's death. It was the first privately owned mill in Cape Town, Cape Colony. Prior to the British occupation of the Cape in the Battle of Muizenberg in 1795, only mills controlled by the Dutch East India Company were allowed. Mostert's Mill had ceased working by 1873 but was owned by the Mostert family until 1889, when it was sold to a Mr Wilks, who sold it in 1891 to Cecil Rhodes. The mill became derelict but a restoration was undertaken by the Dutch millwright Christiaan Bremer. The restored mill was opened on 1 February 1936 by Dr Lorentz, the Minister Plenipotentiary and Envoy Extraordinary to the Netherlands. The ceremony was attended by the Prime Minister, General Hertzog, and flour was ground for the guests.

The mill was worked on occasion but it again became derelict during the Second World War. In 1986, the windshaft broke and the sails crashed to the ground. The Vernacular Architecture Society of South Africa started a campaign to preserve the mill, leading to the formation of the Friends of Mostert's Mill in 1993. A further restoration in 1995 by Dunning-Bremer  (who restored the mill in 1935) returned the mill to working order again at a cost of R245,000.

On 18 April 2021, the mill was gutted in a fire that had started on Table Mountain and destroyed several buildings, including one of the libraries of the University of Cape Town. The fire also destroyed four thatched houses behind the mill. At the time of the fire, Mostert's Mill was South Africa's oldest working mill.

By March 2023, it was reported that the mill had been almost completely restored following the fire of April 2021.  The restoration had been undertaken by the Friends of Moster's Mill, a non-profit organisation.

Description

Mosterts Mill is a three-storey tower mill. It was constructed of random stone for the first  and then unbaked bricks above.

Before the 2021 fire, the cap was of a truncated cone shape and covered by thatch. The mill had four common sails and was winded by a tailpole. The four, modern, common sails followed the Dutch tradition, as there was no surviving sail to copy when Bremer restored the mill in 1935. Such a feature was not to be found on other South African windmills. This was fitted with a cast iron poll end in 1935, because the terminus of the wooden shaft had rotted. Contemporary South African windmills all had wooden windshafts, apart from one of the Salt River windmills, which had an iron cross. A replacement windshaft made of iroko was fitted in 1995. It drove the single pair of millstones, via a lantern pinion stone nut, which had 16 staves. The millstones comprised the original runner stone and a non-original bedstone. The latter was a Cullen stone installed in 1935 and came from a windmill at Leens, Groningen, Netherlands.

Location and access
Mostert's Mill is situated on the M3 close to the University of Cape Town on the slopes of Devil's Peak where it was a prominent landmark. The Friends of Mostert's Mill operated the mill and it was open to the public on one Saturday a month between 10:00 and 14:30.

References

Sources

External links

 Friends of Mostert's Mill
 News report with video of the burnt mill
 Detailed drawings of Mostert's mill

Tower mills
Buildings and structures in Cape Town
Windmills in South Africa
Grinding mills in South Africa
Windmills completed in 1796
1796 in the Cape Colony
Museums in Cape Town
Mill museums in South Africa
1796 establishments in Africa
2021 fires in Africa
2021 in South Africa
Burned buildings and structures
18th-century architecture in South Africa